Massachusetts House of Representatives' 31st Middlesex district in the United States is one of 160 legislative districts included in the lower house of the Massachusetts General Court. It covers Stoneham and Winchester in Middlesex County. Since 2015, Michael Seamus Day of the Democratic Party has represented the district.

The current district geographic boundary overlaps with those of the Massachusetts Senate's 2nd Middlesex and 5th Middlesex districts.

Gov. Charlie Baker (R) signed the state's new legislative maps into law on November 4, 2021.   After the redistricting plans were enacted, Massachusetts Secretary of State William Galvin (D) issued a statement expressing concern regarding how the maps would be implemented: "I am extremely disappointed that these bills were signed into law in their current form and I think it is a devastating blow to the voters of Massachusetts. With local precincts divided multiple ways, it will inevitably lead to chaos at the polls and make it impossible for voters to understand who their elected representatives are."

Representatives

 James Jones 
 Hugh Morgan
 Anthony Gallugi
 Marie Elizabeth Howe
 Edward Connolly
 Paul C. Casey 
 Jason M. Lewis
 Michael Seamus Day, 2015-current

See also
 List of Massachusetts House of Representatives elections
 List of Massachusetts General Courts
 List of former districts of the Massachusetts House of Representatives

Images
Portraits of legislators

References

External links
 Ballotpedia
  (State House district information based on U.S. Census Bureau's American Community Survey).

House
Government of Middlesex County, Massachusetts